Jerome Ripley Brigham (July 21, 1825January 21, 1897) was an American politician and lawyer.

Biography

Born in Fitchburg, Massachusetts, Brigham moved with his parents to Wisconsin Territory in 1839. His uncle was Ebenezer Brigham who was involved in politics in the Wisconsin Territory. Brigham graduated from Amherst College in 1845 and then taught school and studied law in Madison, Wisconsin. He served in local government as town and village clerk. Then, from 1848 to 1851, Brigham served as clerk of the Wisconsin Supreme Court.  In 1851, he moved to Milwaukee, Wisconsin and practiced law. Brigham served on the Milwaukee School Board and the Board of Regents of the University of Wisconsin. He served as city attorney for Milwaukee, Wisconsin. In 1887, Brigham served in the Wisconsin State Assembly. He died in Milwaukee, Wisconsin.

Notes

1825 births
1897 deaths
Politicians from Fitchburg, Massachusetts
Politicians from Milwaukee
Amherst College alumni
Educators from Wisconsin
Wisconsin lawyers
Members of the Wisconsin State Assembly
19th-century American politicians
Lawyers from Milwaukee
19th-century American lawyers
19th-century American educators